In the Little House Below Emauzy (Czech: V tom domecku pod Emauzy) is a 1933 Czech musical drama film directed by Otto Kanturek and starring Adina Mandlová, Antonín Novotný and Ferdinand Hart. It is based on the 1911 operetta  which used melodies by Joseph Lanner (1801–1843). A separate German-language version The Happiness of Grinzing was also produced. Such multiple-language versions were common during the early years of sound film. It was shot at the Barrandov Studios in Prague with sets were designed by the art director . Whereas the operetta and the German version were set in Vienna, this film takes places place close to the Emmaus Monastery in the Czech capital during the nineteenth century.

Cast
 Adina Mandlová as Apolenka Dudková / Komtesa Lubecká
 Antonín Novotný as Postilion Jan Martin 
 Ferdinand Hart as Lopata
 Hermína Fordová as Hrabenka Alzbeta Marie Lubecká 
 Helga Nováková as Stázinka Dudková
 Theodor Pištěk as Hostinský Frantisek Dudek
 Alexander Trebovský as Hrabe Quido Bertran Lubecký 
 Anna Steimarová as ucitelka hudby Gusta Volmanová
 Anton Vaverka as Komorník Alois 
 Walter Taub as Písar August Steibitz
 Jirí Plachý as Ucitel bontonu
 Rudolf Podlesák as ucitel tance Ernesto Pagini 
 Antonín Schmerzenreich as hrabe Vrbna
 Josef Bunzl as ucitel dejepisu a matematiky Marvan
 Miro Bernat as Cellista
 Věra Ferbasová as Host na vecírku

References

Bibliography 
 Goble, Alan. The Complete Index to Literary Sources in Film. Walter de Gruyter, 1999.
 Dassanowsky, Robert von. Austrian Cinema: A History. McFarland, 2005.

External links 
 

1933 films
1933 musical films
Czechoslovak drama films
Czech musical films
1930s Czech-language films
Films based on operettas
Operetta films
Films shot at Barrandov Studios
Films set in Prague
1933 multilingual films
Films set in the 19th century
1930s historical musical films
Czech historical films